FTV-1126, also known as Corona 9034A, was an American area survey optical reconnaissance satellite  launched in 1962. It was a KH-5 Argon satellite, based on an Agena-B. It was also unofficially known as Discoverer 41, a continuation of the designation sequence used for previous US reconnaissance satellites, which had officially been discontinued after Discoverer 38. It was the first KH-5 satellite to complete its mission successfully.

The launch of FTV-1126 occurred at 19:36 UTC on 15 May 1962. A Thor DM-21 Agena-B rocket was used, flying from Launch Complex 75-3-5 at the Vandenberg Air Force Base. Upon successfully reaching orbit, it was assigned the Harvard designation 1962 Sigma 1.

Images were recorded onto  film, and returned in a Satellite Recovery Vehicle, before the satellite ceased operations. The Satellite Recovery Vehicle used by FTV-1126 was 582. Once its images had been returned, the inactive FTV-1126 decayed from orbit on 26 November 1963.

References

Spacecraft launched in 1962
Spacecraft which reentered in 1963